Anna Records was a short-lived record label, known as a forerunner of Motown, founded by sisters Anna and Gwen Gordy and Roquel Billy Davis in 1959 and located in Detroit, Michigan. Gwen Gordy and Davis had written hit songs for Jackie Wilson and Etta James prior to founding the label. Anna Records recorded acts like David Ruffin, future lead singer of the Temptations, Joe Tex, Herman Griffin, Johnny Bristol and his partner Jackey Beavers (the original duo behind the Supremes' "Someday We'll Be Together"), and future Motown hit-making songwriter-producer Lamont Dozier (who went by the name Lamont Anthony at the time). They hired future Motown star Marvin Gaye as drummer for the label.

Anna Records is most notable for issuing the first national Motown hit, "Money (That's What I Want)", recorded by singer-songwriter Barrett Strong, which hit number two on the R&B chart in early 1960. The label wasn't so successful afterwards and in 1961 Anna and all its artists were absorbed by Gwen and Anna's brother Berry Gordy into Motown. Gaye, in particular, became a solo artist and signed with the corporation's oldest label Tamla while still serving as a session drummer, and Ruffin later joined the Temptations, having signed a separate contract with the Gordy subsidiary just prior to signing with Anna. Ruffin's brother Jimmy also briefly recorded for the label.

The label had national distribution through Chess Records. The label issued no albums.

After the label wound up, Anna Gordy joined Motown's staff writing team and Gwen later separated from Davis, going on to form a partnership with singer Harvey Fuqua, whom she married. The couple later formed Harvey Records and Tri-Phi Records. Both labels were also absorbed by Motown in 1963. Gwen and Harvey later joined the Motown songwriting staff. Davis found success as a staff songwriter for Chess Records shortly after Etta James released his co-composition, "All I Could Do Was Cry".

Discography

Singles

See also
List of record labels
Motown Records
Gordy family

References

Soul music record labels
Rhythm and blues record labels
Motown
Record labels established in 1959
Record labels disestablished in 1961
American record labels